George Biagi (born 4 October 1985 in Irvine, Scotland) is a retired Italy international rugby union. He represented Italy on 23 occasions. He was born in Scotland to Scots/Italian father and an Italian mother and later went to Italy to study. He has stated he has equal allegiance to both countries.

Biagi started playing rugby at the age of 13 at Fettes College, Edinburgh. He attended Bocconi University in Milan and started playing with Grande Milano; the following year he moved to Amatori Milano. He was signed by Cavalieri Prato with whom he got promoted to Super 10 (now Top12) and qualified for the European Amlin Challenge Cup. He subsequently transferred to Aironi where he played since the 2010/2011 season, in the Pro12 and the Heineken Cup. In June 2012 he signed for Bristol Rugby but in the summer of 2013, Biagi returned to Italy to join the new franchise Zebre in the Pro12. He played for Zebre until 2019-20 Pro14 season.

References

Italian rugby union players
Italian Scottish rugby union players
Italy international rugby union players
Aironi players
Amatori Rugby Milano players
Bristol Bears players
Zebre Parma players
Rugby union locks
1985 births
Living people
Rugby union players from Irvine, North Ayrshire
People educated at Fettes College